Humboldt Community School District is a rural public school district headquartered in Humboldt, Iowa. It is mostly in Humboldt County, with portions in Webster and Wright counties. It serves Dakota City, Humboldt, Hardy, Renwick, and Rutland.

History

On January 1, 1988, the Boone Valley Community School District dissolved, with a portion absorbed by Humboldt.

In July 2011 the district began a whole grade sharing agreement with the Twin Rivers Community School District. In 2015, 37 students living in the Twin Rivers district in grades 6-12 attended the middle-high school operated by Humboldt.

Schools

 Humboldt High School
 Humboldt Middle School
 Taft Elementary School
 Clyde D. Mease Elementary School (Dakota City)

See also
List of school districts in Iowa

References

External links
 Humboldt Community School District
School districts in Iowa
Education in Humboldt County, Iowa
Education in Webster County, Iowa
Education in Wright County, Iowa